Lipara is a genus of flies in the family Chloropidae. Among the Palearctic species, a specific community of bees and wasps make their nests in the galls of chloropid flies. Most frequently, they use the galls induced by Lipara lucens on common reed stems. Some of these aculeate hymenopteran species, such as the digger wasp Pemphredon fabricii (Crabronidae) or the solitary bee Hylaeus pectoralis (Colletidae) are specialized for nesting in galls induced by Lipara spp. more than a year ago.

Species

L. lucens Meigen, 1830
L. rufitarsis Loew, 1858
L. pullitarsis Doskočil & Chvála, 1971
L. similis Schiner, 1854

Europe
Nearctic

References

Sources

 

Oscinellinae
Chloropidae genera